Seventh Key is the first album by the American rock group Seventh Key.

Track listing

Personnel
Seventh Key
Billy Greer - bass guitar, acoustic guitar, lead vocals
Mike Slamer - electric and acoustic guitars, producer, engineer, mixing
David Manion - keyboards
Chet Wynd - drums
Terry Brock - background vocals

Guest musicians
Igor Len - keyboards  on "Broken Home"
Phil Ehart - drums on "No Man's Land" and "Every Time It Rains"
Steve Walsh - keyboards on "No Man's Land" and "Every Time It Rains"
Steve Morse - guitar on "No Man's Land" and "Every Time It Rains"
Rich Williams - guitar on "Missy", "No Man's Land" and "Every Time It Rains"

Production
Rick Diamond - photography

References

2001 debut albums
Frontiers Records albums